The Explorers Club is an organization formed to further general exploration.

Explorers Club may also refer to:

 Etheric Explorers Club, fictional London society featured in a series of short stories by Paul Marlowe
 Explorers Club (band), progressive rock band
 Explorers' Club of Bangladesh
 Explorers Club Restaurant, a restaurant located in Disneyland Paris
 The Explorers Club (band), pop rock band
 Underwater Explorers Club
 South American Explorers
 The Explorers Club (play), a 2013 play by Nell Benjamin